One of the serum substances which is part of the dissolution process of bacteria, the enzymes will promote the dissolution of the bacterial cell wall and cause the death of the bacteria.

Bacteriolysin probably functions by deregulating lipoteichoic acid (LTA) in Gram-positive bacteria and phospholipids in Gram-negative bacteria.

See also 
 Immune system
 Immunity
 Polyclonal response

References 
 http://onlinelibrary.wiley.com/doi/10.1034/j.1600-0463.2002.1101101.x/abstract;jsessionid=C40F7DA658C09C4F8491ACD72F89E9B7.f04t04

Immune system
Cell biology
Bacteriology